Bairoa is a barrio or district in the municipality of Caguas, Puerto Rico. Its population in 2010 was 19,258. There are close to 60 sectors in Bairoa.

Name 
The barrio of Bairoa gets its name from the Bairoa River which crosses the area from west to east and flows into the Loíza River. There are numerous theories about the name meaning of Bairoa. The word bairoa is most likely of Taíno origin and it possibly comes from the word baira, which is either the native name for the tree Chrysophyllum cainito, or a native word meaning "forest", "wood" or "tree bark", or from the word paira meaning "bow".

Sectors and demographics 
Barrios (which are roughly comparable to minor civil divisions) in turn are further subdivided into smaller local populated place areas/units called sectores (sectors in English). The types of sectores may vary, from normally sector to urbanización to reparto to barriada to residencial, among others.

The following sectors are in Bairoa:

History
The area of Bairoa was originally inhabited by the Taíno people. At the time of the Spanish arrival the area was under control of cacique (tribal chief) Caguax, from whom the city of Caguas gets its name. The first European settlement in the area was the Hato de Bairoa, a cattle farm established and developed between the years 1525 and 1600. The first mention of Bairoa as a district of Caguas comes from the colonial municipal budget documents of 1821 as Bairoa Abajo and Bairoa Arriba (modern day Bairoa, Aguas Buenas). During this time the economy of the barrio was primarily the cultivation of sugarcane and minor fruits, and cattle raising.

Puerto Rico was ceded by Spain in the aftermath of the Spanish–American War under the terms of the Treaty of Paris of 1898 and became an unincorporated territory of the United States. In 1899, the United States Department of War conducted a census of Puerto Rico finding that the combined population of Borinquen barrio and Bairoa barrio was 3,870. According to the 2010 United States Census the population of Bairoa is of 19,258 residents, and the barrio today is primarily suburban and residential.

Landmarks and places of interest 

 Altos de La Mesa and Altos de San Luis, two mountain ridges and secondary forests home to the Puerto Rican plain pigeon.
 Bairoa Forest, secondary forest between the Valle Verde and Golden Gates neighborhoods.
 Bairoa La 25, original section of the historic Carretera Central along the Loíza River.
 Bairoa Park, baseball field and sports complex.
 Bairoa Shopping Center, one of the oldest shopping centers in Caguas.
 El Mariachi, Mexican-Puerto Rican restaurant popular with locals and visitors alike.
 Monte Calvario Cemetery, crematorium and cemetery.
 Plaza Centro Mall, former location of Central Santa Juana and a sugarcane refinery.

Gallery

See also

 Bairoa, Aguas Buenas
List of communities in Puerto Rico

References

External links 
 Caguas government site

Barrios of Caguas, Puerto Rico